Kolarayar River is a 8 km long revived river which acts as a tributary of both the Pamba and the Manimala rivers in the Indian state of Kerala. It passes through the panchayats of Kadapra and Niranam.

References

Rivers of Pathanamthitta district
Pamba River